Vikramaditya Motwane (born 6 December 1976) is an Indian film director, producer and screenwriter who works in Hindi cinema. He is known for films like Udaan (2010), Lootera (2013), Trapped (2017) and Bhavesh Joshi Superhero (2018).

His directorial debut Udaan (2010) was selected to compete in the Un Certain Regard category at the 2010 Cannes Film Festival and also won seven Filmfare awards.  His second film was Lootera, a big-budget Bollywood period romance, released on 5 July 2013. His third film was Trapped, a survival drama starring Rajkummar Rao, released theatrically on 17 March 2017. His fourth film was Bhavesh Joshi Superhero, released theatrically on 1 June 2018. Motwane is the creator of Netflix's first Indian series Sacred Games. In 2020, his film AK vs AK was released.

Mr Motwane is the board member of Mumbai Academy of the Moving Image.

Early and personal life
His father is Sindhi while his mother is Bengali. He is married to photographer Ishika Mohan, who also appeared in his movie Udaan as Rohan's mother.

Career
Motwane was a long-time assistant of Sanjay Leela Bhansali, and collaborated with Bhansali on the films Hum Dil De Chuke Sanam (1999) and Devdas (2002).  He directed the song sequences in Anurag Kashyap's unreleased film Paanch (2003) and was Choreographer on Deepa Mehta's Academy Award-nominated film Water (2005).

Motwane released his debut feature film, entitled Udaan (2010), for Anurag Kashyap's production house, Anurag Kashyap Films, on 16 July 2010., which won seven Filmfare awards including Filmfare critics award for best movie and also won him the Best Director Award at the 2011 Star Screen Awards.

Motwane's second film, a period romance called Lootera, was released on 5 July 2013.

Motwane's third film was a survival drama called Trapped. The film had its world premiere at the Mumbai Film Festival on 26 October 2016, where it was praised and received a Standing ovation. The film was released theatrically on 17 March 2017 to universal critical acclaim. The movie also won the award for 'Best Asian Film' by Neuchâtel International Fantastic Film Festival in 2017.

Motwane created American streaming company Netflix's first Indian series 'Sacred Games', based on the novel of the same name by Vikram Chandra and directed it along with Anurag Kashyap.  The series was met with critical acclaim and Netflix then commissioned a second season for it later.

Motwane was co-owner of Phantom Films, a film production company, with Vikas Bahl, Anurag Kashyap, and Madhu Mantena that dissolved in 2018.

In June 2020, it was announced that Motwane will be adapting the 2019 non-fiction book Black Warrant into a web series. The rights are jointly acquired by his production company Andolan Films and writer-journalist Josy Joseph's Confluence Media.

Filmography

Film

Television

Awards

References

External links

1976 births
Living people
Indian film choreographers
Hindi-language film directors
Indian male screenwriters
Sindhi people
Bengali people
Filmfare Awards winners
Screen Awards winners
Hindi screenwriters
Screenwriters from Maharashtra
21st-century Indian film directors
Film directors from Mumbai
Film producers from Mumbai